Midway is a city in Liberty County, Georgia, United States. It is a part of the Hinesville-Fort Stewart metropolitan statistical area. The population was 2,121 as of the 2010 census, up from 1,100 at the 2000 census.

Midway has several museums, including the Midway Museum and Cemetery and the Dorchester Academy Museum. The Midway Historic District is listed on the National Register of Historic Places.

History

Midway's history dates back to the 18th century. Puritans migrated to St. John's Parish, Georgia, from Dorchester, South Carolina, in 1752 and established several settlements, including what became the Midway community. The Council of Georgia granted them , as colonial officials wanted a large number of settlers in the area to help protect them from the Creek Indians. The original Midway settlers were primarily rice planters and developed a strong agricultural economy, aided by the 1,500 slaves they brought from  South Carolina.

The city of Midway was incorporated in 1925.

In 1973, the Midway Historic District, encompassing the Midway Congregational Church and Cemetery, the Midway Museum, and the Old Sunbury Road, was added to the National Register of Historic Places.

Geography
Midway is located in eastern Liberty County at  (31.799873, -81.412298). The current city limits include the former unincorporated community of Dorchester. The city limits extend east to include Exit 76 on Interstate 95, at the eastern terminus of U.S. Route 84. US 84 leads west from I-95 through Midway  to Hinesville, the Liberty county seat. To the east from I-95, Islands Highway continues  to Colonels Island among the Atlantic coastal marshes.

Industry
Midway has an industrial park with nine manufacturing facilities. In 2007, Target Corporation opened a  regional distribution center, with two sections to the facility being present: Tradeport East and Tradeport West

Demographics

2020 census

As of the 2020 United States census, there were 2,141 people, 615 households, and 457 families residing in the city.

2010 census
As of the 2010 United States Census, there were 2,121 people living in the city. The racial makeup of the city was 45.8% Black, 44.9% White, 0.2% Native American, 1.0% Asian, 0.0% Pacific Islander, 0.4% from some other race and 2.5% from two or more races. 5.2% were Hispanic or Latino of any race.

2000 census
As of the census of 2000, there were 1,100 people, 331 households, and 241 families living in the city. The racial makeup of the city was 58.82% White, 37.18% African American, 0.55% Native American, 1.27% Asian, 0.18% Pacific Islander, 0.45% from other races, and 1.55% from two or more races. Hispanic or Latino of any race were 2.36% of the population.

There were 331 households, out of which 38.4% had children under the age of 18 living with them, 51.1% were married couples living together, 16.3% had a female householder with no husband present, and 26.9% were non-families. 20.8% of all households were made up of individuals, and 6.3% had someone living alone who was 65 years of age or older.  The average household size was 2.81 and the average family size was 3.21.

In the city, the population was spread out, with 25.7% under the age of 18, 7.2% from 18 to 24, 30.7% from 25 to 44, 18.8% from 45 to 64, and 17.5% who were 65 years of age or older.  The median age was 38 years. For every 100 females, there were 92.0 males.  For every 100 females age 18 and over, there were 92.2 males.

The median income for a household in the city was $29,205, and the median income for a family was $31,607. Males had a median income of $27,014 versus $20,313 for females. The per capita income for the city was $13,078.  About 15.2% of families and 19.0% of the population were below the poverty line, including 25.3% of those under age 18 and 20.6% of those age 65 or over.

Culture
The Midway Museum is home to documents, exhibits, and furnishings associated with the Midway Society from the Colonial period through its last meeting in December 1865. The Midway Museum was Georgia's first colonial museum.

Lemonade stand shutdown
In July 2011 Midway received national attention after city police shut down a lemonade stand run by young girls attempting to earn money for a waterpark trip. Police and city officials maintained the girls were required to obtain a business license. Neighboring Richmond Hill allowed the girls to set up their lemonade stand at its first farmer's market later that month.

In the media 
The 2014 award-winning independent film A Promise was filmed in Liberty County.

In 1980 key scenes for the Italian horror film City of the Living Dead were shot within Midway Cemetery across the road from Midway Congregational Church.

Education
Public education is provided by the Liberty County School System. Public schools located in Midway are:

 Liberty Elementary School (grades K through 5)
 Midway Middle School (grades 6 through 8)

Notable people 

 Moses Allen, minister (d. 1779)
 Benjamin Andrew, planter (d. 1790)
 Daniel Baker, Presbyterian minister (d. 1857)
 Abiel Holmes, clergyman and historian (d. 1837)
 Raekwon McMillan, American football linebacker (b. 1995)
 John W. Wilcox Jr., rear admiral in the U.S. Navy (d. 1942)

References

External links
Official website
Midway Museum

Cities in Georgia (U.S. state)
Cities in Liberty County, Georgia
Populated places established in 1925
Populated coastal places in Georgia (U.S. state)
Hinesville metropolitan area